Adur and Worthing Councils refers to two local government bodies, Adur District Council and Worthing Borough Council, in West Sussex, England, who have operated under a joint management structure, with a single Chief Executive, since 1 April 2008.

References

External links 

 

Local government in West Sussex
2008 establishments in England